Parachalciope agonia is a moth of the family Noctuidae first described by George Hampson in 1913. It is found in Tanzania and Uganda.

References

Catocalinae
Insects of Uganda
Moths of Africa